The 1932 Haskell Indians football team was an American football that represented the Haskell Institute (now known as Haskell Indian Nations University) during the 1932 college football season. In its fourth and final year under head coach William Henry Dietz, the team compiled a 2–5–1 record. Louis Weller, John Levi, and Egbert Ward were assistant coaches.

Orien Crow, a Cherokee Indian, was the team captain. Crow was also selected as the first-team center on the 1932 All-Kansas football team. Halfback Robert Holmes was named to the second team.

Prior to the start of the 1932 season, the school announced that it would limit the football team to eight game in order to allow players to focus on classroom work. In addition, the Bureau of Indian Affairs (BIA) terminated junior college offerings at Haskell, with the result that many players were unable to return to the school. After the 1932 season, the BIA announced its opposition to Haskell's "commercialized inter-institutional athletics." Thereafter, Haskell never again reached the heights of big-time college football.

Dietz resigned his Haskell position in March 1933 to accept a job in the National Football League as the head coach of the Boston Redskins (later renamed the Washington Redskins). Assistant coach Weller also left Haskell and played for Dietz's 1933 Boston Redskins.

Schedule

References

Haskell
Haskell Indian Nations Fighting Indians football seasons
Haskell Indians football